Cognitive skills, also called cognitive functions, cognitive abilities or cognitive capacities, are brain-based skills which are needed in acquisition of knowledge, manipulation of information and reasoning. They have more to do with the mechanisms of how people learn, remember, solve problems and pay attention, rather than with actual knowledge. Cognitive skills or functions encompass the domains of perception, attention, memory, learning, decision making, and language abilities.

Specialisation of functions

Cognitive science has provided theories of how the brain works, and these have been of great interest to researchers who work in the empirical fields of brain science. A fundamental question is whether cognitive functions, for example visual processing and language, are autonomous modules, or to what extent the functions depend on each other. Research evidence points towards a middle position, and it is now generally accepted that there is a degree of modularity in aspects of brain organisation. In other words, cognitive skills or functions are specialised, but they also overlap or interact with each other. Deductive reasoning, on the other hand, has been shown to be related to either visual or linguistic processing, depending on the task; although there are also aspects that differ from them. All in all, research evidence does not provide strong support for classical models of cognitive psychology.

Cognitive functioning

Cognitive functioning refers to a person's ability to process thoughts. It is defined as "the ability of an individual to perform the various mental activities most closely associated with learning and problem-solving. Examples include the verbal, spatial, psychomotor, and processing-speed ability." Cognition mainly refers to things like memory, speech, and the ability to learn new information. The brain is usually capable of learning new skills in the aforementioned areas, typically in early childhood, and of developing personal thoughts and beliefs about the world. Old age and disease may affect cognitive functioning, causing memory loss and trouble thinking of the right words while speaking or writing ("drawing a blank"). Multiple sclerosis (MS), for example, can eventually cause memory loss, an inability to grasp new concepts or information, and depleted verbal fluency.

Humans generally have a high capacity for cognitive functioning once born, so almost every person is capable of learning or remembering. Intelligence is tested with IQ tests and others, although these have issues with accuracy and completeness. In such tests, patients may be asked a series of questions, or to perform tasks, with each measuring a cognitive skill, such as level of consciousness, memory, awareness, problem-solving, motor skills, analytical abilities, or other similar concepts. Early childhood is when the brain is most malleable to orientate to tasks that are relevant in the person's  environment.

See also
 Adaptive behavior
 Adaptive functioning
Intelligence Quotient (IQ)
 Cognition
 Cognitive Abilities Test
 Jungian cognitive functions

Further reading
Cognitive Functioning at Edublox

References

 NCME - Glossary of Important Assessment and Measurement Terms [cognitive ability]

Cognition